Baladeva Vidyabhushana (also written ) ( 1700 – 1793 AD) was an Indian Gaudiya Vaishnava acharya (religious teacher).Despite being renowned all over the world as the Gaudiya Vedanta Acarya, the scarcity of available authentic biodata has led misinformed authors to spread incorrect information about his life incidents. There is no known historical evidence regarding either his birthplace or date, nor any known reference to it in his works. Some wrongly believe that he disappeared in 1768. Yet his Aisvarya-kadambini is dated 1779 (year 1701 of Shaka era). The original manuscript is preserved at the City Palace in Jaipur. While his birth date is unknown, a document preserved at the Jaipur Archives dated the fourteenth day of the Bhadra month of Saṁvat 1850 (nineteenth of September, 1793 AD) describes his ceremony of condolence presided by King Pratap Singh of Jaipur (ruled 1778-1803 AD). On the basis of this evidence, it is unrealistic to assume that he was born much before 1700 AD.

 
The earliest documents that mention Vidyabhusana belong to the 1740s. According to oral tradition, he was born in Odisha (possibly near Remuna, Balasore). Yet it is not clear when and how this oral tradition started. The first mention to it in written form was not earlier than late 19th century.

Also according to oral tradition, at an early age he received a thorough education in grammar, poetry, rhetoric and logic. After concluding his studies, he went on a pilgrimage to various place in India. According to Vidyabhusana's statement at the end of his Siddhanta-ratna, he had been previously initiated in the Madhva-sampradaya before becoming a follower of the philosophy of Sri Caitanya Mahaprabhu.  When he visited Jagannatha Puri (Odisha), he met Sri Radha-Damodara Deva, a grand-disciple of Sri Rasikananda Deva, with whom he discussed philosophy. Sri Radha-Damodara Deva explained the conclusions of Gaudiya Vaishnava Theology as expounded by Sri Caitanya Mahaprabhu. Moved by those teachings, Baladeva was initiated and began to study the Sat-sandarbhas of Sri Jiva Gosvami.

In a short time he became experienced in Gaudiya Vaisnava philosophy. With his guru's permission and blessings, he moved to Sri Vrindavana (Vrindavan) to study these teachings under Sri Visvanatha Chakravarti Thakura. Baladeva fully accepted the Gaudiya Vaisnava philosophy and became a powerful exponent of this system.

His first known work was a commentary on the Vedanta-sutra or Brahma-sutra, entitled Brahma-sutra-karika-bhasya. It was composed by Vidyabhusana under the order of King Sawai Jai Singh II (1688-1743 AD), as mentioned at the beginning and the end of the manuscript. The work is not dated, but from the available historical documentation, it can be inferred that it was written between 1730 and 1740 AD. This was the Vedanta commentary that Vidyabhusana wrote very quickly in order to appease the King and the opponents who belittled the Gaudiyas for not having a Brahma-sutra-bhasya. The much more famous Govinda-bhasya was a much later and more elaborate work, and its oldest known manuscript is dated Saṁvat 1815 (1758 AD).

Some claim that Baladeva received the title "Vidyabhusana" from the King or from the Ramanandis. However, the Karika-bhasya manuscript and his other earlier manuscripts are signed "Vidyabhusana." He may have received this title before joining the Gaudiyas, probably when he was a Tattvavadi debater. Another of his earlier works was the Tattva-dipika, also written under the order of Sawai Jai Singh II.

Some misinformed individuals also claim that the Govinda-bhasya was written at Galta, to which there is not the slightest evidence and which makes no sense at all, as according to documentary evidence, even during Sawai Jai Singh II Vidyabhusana was the Mahant of the New Govinda-deva Temple in Vrindavan as well as of his own temple in Jaipur, and the idea that he left his duties in both places to sit down in a temple of another sampradaya to write a commentary is nothing but absurd.

The earliest documents that mention Baladeva Vidyabhusana belong to the 1740s, therefore it is most unlikely that he had any participation in the Amer/Jaipur debates before the 1730s.

Other works include Siddhanta-ratnam (Govinda-bhasya-pithakam), Prameya-ratnavali, Siddhanta-darpana, Kavya-kaustubha, Vyakarana-kaumudi, Pada-kaustubha, Isadi-upanisad bhasya, Gitabhusana-bhasya, Sri Visnunama-sahasra-nama-bhasya, Sanksepa-bhagavatamrta- tippani, Tattva-sandarbha-tika, Stava-mala-vibhusana-bhasya, Nataka-candrika-tika, Candraloka-tika, Sahitya-kaumudi, Srimad-Bhagavata-tika (Vaisnavanandini).

Commentary on Vedanta
An important story attached to Sri Baladeva concerns his writing of the Vedanta commentary, his first known work. The Vaishnava sect known as Ramanandi sect allegedly complained that because the Gaudiya Vaisnavas had no commentary on the Vedanta Sutra, they were not qualified to worship the Deity and therefore the worship should be turned over to them. They also objected to the worship of Srimati Radharani along with Sri Krishna because they were not authorized anywhere in the shastras.

The Ramanandis informed King Sawai Jai Singh II at Jaipur, Rajasthan who sent word to Vrindavana informing the devotees what had happened. At that time Srila Visvanatha Cakravarti was very aged so in his place, he sent his student, Sri Baladeva. Despite his strong arguments, the scholars in the assembly refused to accept anything other than a direct commentary on the sutra. Having no other recourse, Baladeva promised to present them with one. Sri Baladeva sought solace at Sri Govindaji's mandira (temple) in Jaipur. Feeling aggrieved, he informed Sri Govinda of everything that had happened. Legend has it that the Lord came to Sri Baladeva that night in a dream and told him to write the Vedanta sutra. Invigorated, Sri Baladeva began to write, and quickly completed the task.

Impressed with the commentary, the Ramanandis expressed their desire to accept initiation from Sri Baladeva Vidyabhushana. However, he declined their request by stating that among the four authorized sampradayas, the Sri sampradaya was highly respectable and the foremost adherent of Dasya-bhakti (devotion in servitorship).

In Vrindavan
Returning from Jaipur to Vrindavana, Sri Baladeva presented the certificate of victory to Srila Visvanatha Cakravarti Thakura and narrated the events that had transpired. Cakravartipada bestowed his full blessings on Sri Baladeva. At this time, Sri Baladeva Vidyabhushana began to write a commentary on Srila Jiva Gosvami's Sat-sandarbha.

Sri Vijaya Govinda, residing at Gokulananda Mandira in Vrindavana, is said to have been worshiped by Baladeva Vidyabhushana personally. According to the opinion of some devotees, Sri Baladeva Vidyabhushana installed the large Deities Sri Radha-Syamasundara.

After the departure of Sri Visvanatha Cakravarti Thakura Sri Baladeva Vidyabhushana became the next acharya of the Gaudiya Vaisnava sampradaya.

He had two well-known disciples, Sri Uddhava dasa and Sri Nanda Misra.

His samadhi is located on the back side of Sri-Sri-Radha-Shyamsundar Temple, Sevakunj, Vrindavan.

See also

 Nityananda

References

External links
 Baladeva Vidyabhusana Research Project
 Baladeva Vidyabhusana Life and Works
 Baladeva Vidyabhusana Free PDFs
 Baladeva Vidyabhusana

1793 deaths
Vedanta
Year of birth unknown
People from Balasore district
Year of birth uncertain